Shah Galdi (also Romanized as Shāh Galdī) is a village in Somghan Rural District, Chenar Shahijan District, Kazerun County, Fars Province, Iran. At the 2006 census, its population was 136, in 28 families.

References 

Populated places in Chenar Shahijan County